Luna Sea Memorial Cover Album -Re:birth- is a Luna Sea tribute album released on December 19, 2007. It collects cover versions of their songs performed by various artists. The release of the album coincided with Luna Sea's one-night reunion concert on December 24, 2007.

Track listing

References 

2007 albums
Tribute albums
Luna Sea